Distichodus rufigiensis is a species of freshwater fish in the family Distichodontidae. It is endemic to Tanzania and occurs in the Wami, Rufiji, and Ruvuma River systems.

This species is native to a tropical climate. It inhabits rivers and may also colonized reservoirs. It grows to  total length. D. rufigiensis is decreasing in population due to the threats of illegal fishing, siltation choking its spawning substrate, and land-based pollution.

References

Distichodus
Endemic fauna of Tanzania
Fish of Tanzania
Taxonomy articles created by Polbot
Taxa named by John Roxborough Norman
Fish described in 1922